The 1947 Lafayette Leopards football team was an American football team that represented Lafayette College during the 1947 college football season.  In its first season under head coach Ivy Williamson, the team compiled a 6–3 record and was outscored by a total of 156 to 89. The Leopards lost their first two games under their new head coach, but then won six of seven games during the remainder of the season. The team played its home games at Fisher Field in Easton, Pennsylvania.

Schedule

References

Lafayette
Lafayette Leopards football seasons
Lafayette football